Matthew Norton Wise (born 1940) is an American historian of science who serves as a professor at the University of California, Los Angeles (UCLA).  He is also the co-director of the UCLA Center for Society and Genetics. He has famously attacked Gross and Levitt's book in which they perceive the obstruction of science by the academic left.

Early life and education

Wise was born on April 2, 1940, in Tacoma, Washington. obtained a BSc in physics from Pacific Lutheran University in 1962 and went on to obtain two PhDs: a PhD in experimental nuclear physics from Washington State University in 1968, and a PhD in the history of science from Princeton University in 1977.

Career

Wise was a physics professor at Auburn University and Oregon State University before becoming a history professor at UCLA and then, from 1991 to 2000, Princeton, before returning to UCLA, where he remains.

In the fourth term of the academical year 2004/5 he taught at Utrecht University and he spent much of his time at the Max Planck Institute in Berlin.

He is the recipient of the Berthold Leibinger Berlin Prize and Fellow at the American Academy in Berlin for Spring 2012.

External links
Norton Wise at the UCLA History Department
Norton Wise at the Center for Society and Genetics

20th-century American historians
American male non-fiction writers
21st-century American historians
21st-century American male writers
Living people
American historians of science
Philosophers of science
Princeton University alumni
1940 births
University of California, Los Angeles faculty
Pacific Lutheran University alumni
Washington State University alumni
Auburn University faculty
Oregon State University faculty
Historians from California
20th-century American male writers